Titea sublutea is a species of butterfly of the family Lycaenidae. It is found in New Guinea.

Subspecies
Titea sublutea sublutea (West Irian to Papua New Guinea)
Titea sublutea extensa Tite, 1963 (West Irian: Arfak Mountains, Angi Lakes)

References

Butterflies described in 1906
Luciini